A Contrary, among the historical Amerindian tribes of the Great Plains, a tribe member who adopted behavior deliberately the opposite of other tribal members. They were a small number of individuals loosely organized into a cult that was devoted to the practice of contrary behavior.

The Contraries are related, in part, to the clown organizations of the Plains Indians, as well as to Plains military societies that contained reverse warriors. The Lakota word heyoka, which translates as clown or opposites, serves as a collective title for these institutionalized forms of contrary behavior of the Plains Indians. When Lakota Indians first saw European clowns, they identified them with their own term for clowns, heyoka.

History of concept 
George B. Grinnell introduced the designation Contraries based on his visits to the Cheyenne around 1898. Written accounts of the heyoka (i.e., the Contraries and clowns of the Lakota and Santee) were published even earlier. The cultural anthropologist Julian Steward described various forms of contrary behavior in 1930. In 1945, Verne Ray  examined contrary behavior in the ritual dances and ceremonies of North American Indians and differentiated a further characteristic of the contrary complex of the Plains Indians, reverse reaction, which means to do the opposite of what one is asked.

Social role 
The social role of the Plains Indian clowns was ceremonial since they performed primarily during rituals, dances and feasts. Unlike the clowns, the special role of the Contraries was not restricted to brief performances, rituals or the warpath. It was their everyday life. The Contraries of the Plains Indians were unique and historically unprecedented. John Plant examined the ethnological phenomena of contrary behavior, particularly in the tribes of the North American Plains Indians.

The Contraries of the Plains Indians were individuals committed to an extraordinary life-style in which they did the opposite of what others normally do. They thus turned all social conventions into their opposites.  

Contrary behavior means deliberately doing the opposite of what others routinely or conventionally do. It was usually accompanied by inverse speech, in which one says the opposite of what one actually means. For example, "no!" expresses "yes!" And "hello" means "goodbye". To say "Grandfather, go away!" would be an invitation for him to come.

Reverse warriors 
In addition to the Contraries and the ceremonial clowns, many Plains tribes recognized certain persons having the role of "reverse" warriors. These were usually experienced warriors who in battle purposely abided by contrary, foolish or crazy principles. Generally, they belonged to military organizations that also took part in dance ceremonies. Only the "reverse" warriors used inverse speech, and only they did the opposite of what they were commanded or instructed to do (reverse reaction). The "reverse" warrior charged into battle when ordered to retreat and could only fall back when he was commanded to attack.

References  

Religious occupations of the indigenous peoples of North America
Indigenous culture of the Great Plains